Abdurrahman Nurettin Pasha, also known as Nurettin Pasha (1836–1912) was an Ottoman statesman. He was the Grand Vizier of the Ottoman Empire from 2 May 1882 to 12 July 1882.

Biography
Born in Kütahya in 1836, Abdurrahman was a descendant of the Germiyanids, who flourished in that area after the decline and eventual fall of the Seljuq Sultanate of Rûm. His father, Haji Ali Pasha, was one of the Ottoman governors who died on 25 May 1874 while serving as the governor of Kastamonu.

Abdurrahman first served in various positions under his father.  In 1872 he was promoted to the rank of vizier.  He served as an Ottoman provincial governor (his posts included Ankara and Baghdad) before serving as grand vizier to Sultan Abdülhamid II in 1882.  Later he was Minister of Justice (1895–1908).

The son of Abdurrahman Pasha married to Naile Sultan, daughter of Sultan Abdulhamid. The son-in-law of Abdurrahman Pasha was Turkish musicologist Hüseyin Sadeddin Arel, and his nephew was Münir Nurettin Selçuk, the Turkish classical musician.

References

19th-century Grand Viziers of the Ottoman Empire
1833 births
1912 deaths
Ottoman governors of Aidin
People from Kütahya
Ottoman governors of Baghdad